Parliamentary elections were held in the Kingdom of Dalmatia in 1870.

Results

Elected representatives

People's Party
Rafo Pucić
Ante Radman

Autonomists
Vincenzo Alesani
Antonio Bajamonti
Cosimo de Begna Possedaria (1870–1873)
Natale Filippi (1870–1873)
Gaetano Frari
Matteo Gligo
Stefano Knezevich
Andrea Krussevich (1872–1873 and 1875–1876)
Francesco Lanza (1870–1874)
Luigi Lapenna (1872–1873)
Pietro Doimo Maupas
Luigi Mery
Francesco Milcovich (1874–1876)
Giuseppe Mladineo (1871–1874)
Luigi Nutrizio (1875–1876)
Giuseppe Piperata (1871–1873)
Valerio Ponte (1870–1870)
Giuseppe Radman (1874–1876)
Simeone Rossignoli (1874–1876)
Niccolò Trigari (1874–1876)
Vincenzo Vuletich (1871–1876)

Elections in Croatia
Dalmatia
1870 in Croatia
Elections in Austria-Hungary
History of Dalmatia
Election and referendum articles with incomplete results